Lim Lip Eng (born 25 July 1972) is a Malaysian politician who has served as Member of Parliament (MP) for Kepong since May 2018 and for Segambut from March 2008 to May 2018. He is a member of the Democratic Action Party (DAP), a component party of the Pakatan Harapan (PH) opposition coalition.

Early career 
Lim is a lawyer by profession.

Political career 
Lim was first elected to Parliament in the 2008 election winning the seat of Segambut from the governing Barisan Nasional (BN) coalition. Segambut had previously been considered as a BN stronghold. The election saw urban Chinese and Indian voters swarm to the DAP and its coalition allies; however, given the large minority of Malay voters in Segambut, Lim's victory was also attributable to a sizeable number of Muslim Malays in the constituency backing the DAP, a secular party with few Malay members or politicians. In the 2013 election he re-elected to the Segambut seat for second term. In the 2018 election Lim switched to Kepong constituency and won the seat by an extremely large majority and percentage of total votes. He retained the seat in the 2022 election with a slightly smaller majority and percentage of total votes.

Controversies 
Lim Lip Eng was engulfed with a major controversy in August 2019 after suggesting that the implementation of Malay Khat Calligraphy into school children syllabus as rubbing "cow manure on our faces". After severe backlash he apologized and deleted the post from Facebook.

Election results

References

1972 births
Living people
21st-century Malaysian politicians
Democratic Action Party (Malaysia) politicians
Kuala Lumpur politicians
Malaysian Christians
20th-century Malaysian lawyers
Malaysian politicians of Chinese descent
Malaysian people of Hokkien descent
Malaysian people of Chinese descent
Members of the Dewan Rakyat
21st-century Malaysian lawyers